The Gordon and Betty Moore Foundation is an American foundation established by Intel co-founder Gordon E. Moore and his wife Betty I. Moore in September 2000 to support scientific discovery, environmental conservation, patient care improvements and preservation of the character of the Bay Area.

As outlined in the Statement of Founder's Intent, the foundation's aim is to tackle large, important issues at a scale where it can achieve significant and measurable impacts.

According to the OECD, the Gordon and Betty Moore Foundation provided USD 60 million for development in 2020 by means of grants.

Funded projects

Astronomy
 All Sky Automated Survey for SuperNovae (ASAS-SN)
 Event Horizon Telescope (EHT)
 Hydrogen Epoch of Reionization Array (HERA)
 South Pole Telescope (SPT)
 Thirty Meter Telescope (TMT)
 W. M. Keck Observatory
 BICEP and Keck Array

Biology
 Center for Ocean Solutions
 Community Cyberinfrastructure for Advanced Marine Microbial Ecology Research and Analysis
 Foldscope
 Global Ocean Sampling Expedition
 Advanced Imaging Center (AIC) | Janelia Research Campus
 Betty Irene Moore School of Nursing | UC Davis

Quantum materials
 Emergent Phenomena in Quantum Systems Initiative

Data-driven discovery
 Jupyter
 Julia (programming language)
 Data Carpentry
 NumPy Python Package
 Numba Python Package
 Dask Python Package
 R Consortium in support of R programming language projects

Moore-Sloan Data Science Environments
 Berkeley Institute for Data Science (BIDS)
 NYU Center for Data Science
 UW eScience Institute

Marine Microbiology Initiative (initiative ending in 2021) 

 Investigator awards for high-risk microbial ecology research (2012)

Other (standalone) projects
 PLOS (Public Library of Science)
 Wikidata
 ASAPBio

Controversies
The Gordon and Betty Moore Foundation has contributed US$200 million towards construction of the Thirty Meter Telescope.  A proposed extremely large telescope (ELT), the Thirty Meter Telescope (TMT) is considered controversial due to its planned location on Mauna Kea, which is considered sacred land according to the native Hawaiians, on the island of Hawaii in the United States.  Native Hawaiian cultural practice and religious rights are the main points of opposition towards the construction of the Thirty Meter Telescope, along with concerns over the lack of meaningful dialogue during the permitting process.

On October 7, 2014, protesters demonstrated outside the headquarters of the foundation in Palo Alto, California.  On July 14, 2019, protesters had created an online petition titled "The Immediate Halt to the Construction of the TMT Telescope" that was posted on Change.org and directed towards the Gordon and Betty Moore Foundation as well as other financial backers.  The online petition gathered over 278,057 signatures worldwide.

See also
List of wealthiest charitable foundations

References

External links

Conservation and environmental foundations in the United States
Organizations established in 2000
Organizations based in the San Francisco Bay Area
Scientific research foundations in the United States
Science and technology in the San Francisco Bay Area
2000 establishments in California